The Mercedes-Benz W120 and Mercedes-Benz W121 are technically similar inline-four cylinder sedans made by Daimler-Benz. The W120 was first introduced by Mercedes-Benz in 1953. Powered initially by the company's existing 1.8 liter M136 engine, it was sold as the Mercedes-Benz 180 through 1962. From 1954, Mercedes-Benz also offered the W120 with a diesel engine as the Mercedes-Benz 180 D. The Mercedes-Benz W121 was introduced as the Mercedes-Benz 190 in 1956, powered by a 1.9 liter M121 engine. From 1958, the W121 was also offered with an OM621 engine, sold as the Mercedes-Benz 190 D through 1961.

The W120 was nicknamed the Ponton (along with other Mercedes models) after its introduction, because it employed Ponton, or pontoon styling, a prominent styling trend that unified a car's previously articulated hood, body, fenders and running boards into a singular envelope.

Together with the longer wheelbase and more luxurious 2.2 liter inline-six cylinder W128 model 220, they constituted 80% of Mercedes-Benz' car production between 1953 and 1959.

The W120 was the first predecessor to the medium size Mercedes-Benz E-Class sedan line.

History
The base 4-cylinder 180 / 190 and the W105 six-cylinder 219 'Ponton' models looked very similar in appearance, from the rear doors forward, to the more luxury W128 and W180 stretched wheelbase six-cylinder 220a and 220 S(E) models. From behind, one could not easily differentiate even the top-of-the-line 220SE (E for 'Einspritzung', or fuel injection) from a base 180 model, but the longer bonnet (and wheelbase), and chrome touches identified it as an upscale, six-cylinder model.

The 1951 to 1957 Mercedes-Benz 300 W186 Adenauer company flagship used a much larger frame and body, and was an entirely different car.

The 180 and 190 four-cylinders were widely used as German taxis. Only these shorter Pontons featured low-wattage parking clearance lights at front bumper top rear. A simple left-right toggle above and to the left of the driver's knee selected which side would illuminate, so as not to needlessly run down the battery in winter, no small concern when restarting diesels. Heater air intakes were on both sides of the radiator grille only on the W120/W121.

The form and body of the car changed little during its production run. However, in 1957, a year after the introduction of the 190 saloon, the 180's  M136 engine, which had originally been designed for the Mercedes-Benz 170 Sb, was replaced with a downtuned version of the 190's M 121. The same year, the Mercedes star atop the faux external radiator cap was made spring-loaded to give when bumped: reports at the time indicated that this was either to pander to the requirements of certain export markets, notably Switzerland, or to reduce the risk of pedestrian injury in the event of an accident. By 1959, the star was spring-retained on a ball base.

A related roadster variant, the R121, better known as the 190SL, was produced from 1955 to 1963.

At the 1959 Frankfurt Motor Show, in time for the 1960 US model year, a slightly wider grille and slimmer taillights were introduced. The same wider grille was carried forward to the car's (in other respects) more flamboyantly styled successors, when the Pontons were replaced by the W110 "Fintail" models during 1961.

Technical description 

The Mercedes-Benz W 120 and W 121 are four-door saloons with a longitudinal front engine, and rear-wheel drive. Rolling chassis with either two or four doors were also available from the factory. The cars have a self-supporting body, the so-called "Ponton" body. The wheelbase measures 2650 mm, which is slightly less than the larger "Ponton" saloons' 2750 mm. In front, the W 120 and W 121 have independent double-wishbone suspension, in rear, they have either a double-joint swing axle (until September 1955), or a single-joint swing axle (from September 1955). Both front and rear wheels are coil-sprung; the front axle is fitted with a torsion-type anti-sway bar, and the rear wheels have additional hydraulic shock absorbers. Daimler-Benz installed a recirculating ball steering system and a hydraulic drum braking system in the 120- and 121-series.

Mercedes-Benz built the W 120 with all of their then-present four-cylinder engines: the M 136 and M 121 Otto (spark ignition) engines, and the OM 636 and OM 621 Diesel (compression ignition) engines, with most W 120 and W 121 cars powered by either of the Diesel engines. The torque is sent from the engine to the rear wheels through a dry single-disc clutch and a synchronised, four-speed constant-mesh gearbox. The shift lever is a rather small lever mounted on the steering column.

Models

References

External links 

the W120 Ponton presented by Mercedes-Benz Classic Center USA

W120
W120
Rear-wheel-drive vehicles
Sedans
Roadsters
1960s cars
Cars introduced in 1953
Limousines